Pareuryaptus is a genus of beetles in the family Carabidae, containing the following species:

 Pareuryaptus adoxus (Tschitscherine, 1900)
 Pareuryaptus aethiops (Tschitscherine, 1900)
 Pareuryaptus annamensis (Jedlicka, 1962)
 Pareuryaptus cambodgiensis Dubault, Lassalle & Roux, 2008
 Pareuryaptus chalceolus (Bates, 1892)
 Pareuryaptus chalcodes (Andrewes, 1923)
 Pareuryaptus curtulus (Chaudoir, 1868)
 Pareuryaptus cyanellus (Tschitscherine, 1900)
 Pareuryaptus exiguus Dubault, Lassalle & Roux, 2008
 Pareuryaptus formosanus (Jedlicka, 1962)
 Pareuryaptus gilletti Dubault, Lassalle & Roux, 2008
 Pareuryaptus glastenvalum (Morvan, 1992)
 Pareuryaptus laolumorum Dubault, Lassalle & Roux, 2008
 Pareuryaptus lucidus (Andrewes, 1931)
 Pareuryaptus morosus (Tschitscherine, 1900)
 Pareuryaptus parvus Dubault, Lassalle & Roux, 2008

References

Pterostichinae